

Events 
 November 13 – Public meeting in Darlington, England, resolves to promote a Stockton and Darlington Railway.

Births 

 April 4 – Robert Pearson Brereton, chief assistant to Isambard Kingdom Brunel who completed many engineering projects after Brunel's death in 1859 (d. 1894)
 July 22 – J. Gregory Smith, president of Northern Pacific Railway 1866–1872, is born (died 1891)

Unknown date births 
 Septimus Norris, steam locomotive designer often credited as the designer of the first 4-6-0 (died 1862)

Deaths

See also 
 Years in rail transport

References